The 1897–98 season was the sixth in the history of the Western Football League.

For this season the league was restructured, with a new Professional Section being formed, taking five clubs from Division One and three new clubs joining. Division One and Division Two remained as the Amateur Section, with four clubs being promoted from Division Two to Division One, and several new clubs joining both divisions.

Bristol City were the champions of the new Professional Section, and also competed in the Southern League during this season, along with Swindon Town, Reading and Warmley. Division One of the Amateur Section was won by Bedminster, and the Division Two champions were newcomers Hanham. Many clubs left the Amateur Section at the end of the season, necessitating a merger of the two amateur divisions for the following season.

Professional section
The three new clubs admitted to the league to play in this eight-club section were:
Eastleigh Athletic
Reading
Swindon Town
Bristol South End changed their name to Bristol City
St George changed their name to Bristol St George

Amateur Division One
This ten-club division was a continuation of the old Division One, with six new clubs:
Barton Hill, promoted from the old Division Two
Eastville Wanderers, promoted from the old Division Two
Fishponds, promoted from the old Division Two
Mangotsfield, promoted from the old Division Two
Midsomer Norton, also playing in the Somerset Senior League
Radstock, also playing in the Somerset Senior League

Amateur Division Two
This eight-club division was a continuation of the old Division Two, with seven new clubs:
Barton Hill Reserves
Cotham
Eastville Wanderers Reserves
Fishponds Reserves
Hanham
Royal Artillery (Horfield) (not to be confused with Royal Artillery Portsmouth F.C.)
St Paul's Reserves

References

1897-98
1897–98 in English association football leagues